Krasnoarmeysky is a rural locality (a khutor) in Shendzhyskoye Rural Settlement of Takhtamukaysky District, the Republic of Adygea, Russia. The population was 46 as of 2018. There are 2 streets.

Geography 
Krasnoarmeysky is located 14 km southeast of Takhtamukay (the district's administrative centre) by road. Novomogilyovsky is the nearest rural locality.

References 

Rural localities in Takhtamukaysky District